Ayn-al-Qużāt Hamadānī, also spelled Ain-al Quzat Hamedani or ʿAyn-al Qudat Hamadhani (1098–1131), full name: Abu’l-maʿālī ʿabdallāh Bin Abībakr Mohammad Mayānejī, was a Persian  jurisconsult, mystic, philosopher, poet and mathematician who was executed at the age of 33.

Title 
Ayn-al-Qużat in Arabic means "the pearl of the judges": Ayn means the eye, implying something very valuable, and Qozat is the plural of Qadi, which means judge.

Life
He was born in Hamedan and his ancestors were of Hamedan judges. He was a disciple of Ahmad Ghazali and devoted of Hallaj. He became a famous scholar at early age, and by the time he was thirty he was chosen to be a judge. Along with Abu Hamed Al-Ghazali, he is one of the founders of doctrinal Sufism. According to some accounts, he was briefly a pupil of Omar Khayyam. Upon his return from pilgrimage, Khayyam likely stayed in Hamadan for some time. It is possible that during his stay he became tutor to the young Ain al-Quzat. However, Aminrazavi (2007) believes that from the figures who may have studied with Khayyam Ain al-Quzat is the least likely and that arguing their association is wishful thinking by those who like to view Khayyam as a Sufi. Unlike most of the Sufis who have lived as respected and revered members of their communities, he fell afoul of the Seljuk rulers and was accused of heresy and executed, either by crucifixion or burning.

Ayn al-Quzat along with Mansur al-Hallaj and Shahab al-Din Suhrawardi are known as the three martyrs of Sufism. Ibn Isa is one of them as well.

Work
The most significant works of Ayn al-Qożāt are Tamhīdāt (Preludes) and Zubdat al-ḥaqāʾiq fī kašf al-ḵalāʾeq (The Essence of Truth). Both books are masterpieces of Sufi literature and have mystical and philosophical significance.
Ayn al-Qożāt Hamadānī quoted a few verses apparently in his own Iranian dialect (where it is called fahlavī; bayt-e pahlavī in a manuscript variant).

Poetry
A famous quatrain is said to be his:

This quatrain refers to his execution by Caliph's order.

See also

Persian literature
List of Persian poets and authors

References

Further reading

External links
Poems by Ayn al-Qozat Hamadani
The Apologia Of Ain Al Qudat Al Hamadhani at archive.org.

1098 births
1131 deaths
12th-century Iranian philosophers
Sufi mystics
12th-century Iranian mathematicians
Executed Iranian people
12th-century Persian-language poets
12th-century executions
People from Hamadan
People executed by the Abbasid Caliphate
Scholars from the Seljuk Empire
Executed philosophers
Iranian Muslim mystics